The Best FIFA Football Awards 2022 were held on 27 February 2023 in Paris, France.

Winners and nominees

The Best FIFA Men's Player

Fourteen players were initially shortlisted on 12 January 2023. The three finalists were revealed on 10 February 2023.

Lionel Messi won the award with 52 scoring points.

The selection criteria for the men's players of the year was: respective achievements during the period from 8 August 2021 to 18 December 2022.

The Best FIFA Men's Goalkeeper

Five players were initially shortlisted on 12 January 2023. The three finalists were revealed on 8 February 2023.

Emiliano Martínez won the award with 26 ranking points.

The Best FIFA Men's Coach

Five coaches were initially shortlisted on 12 January 2023. The three finalists were revealed on 9 February 2023.

Lionel Scaloni won the award with 28 scoring points.

The Best FIFA Women's Player

Fourteen players were initially shortlisted on 12 January 2023. The three finalists were revealed on 10 February 2023.

Alexia Putellas won the award with 50 scoring points, her second consecutive win.

The selection criteria for the women's players of the year was: respective achievements during the period from 7 August 2021 to 31 July 2022.

The Best FIFA Women's Goalkeeper

Six players were initially shortlisted on 12 January 2023. The three finalists were revealed on 8 February 2023.

Mary Earps won the award with 26 scoring points.

The Best FIFA Women's Coach

Six coaches were initially shortlisted on 12 January 2023. The three finalists were revealed on 9 February 2023.

Sarina Wiegman won the award with 28 scoring points.

FIFA Puskás Award
 
The eleven players initially shortlisted for the award were announced on 12 January 2023. The three finalists were revealed on 10 February 2023. All goals up for consideration were scored from 8 August 2021 to 18 December 2022. Every registered FIFA.com user was allowed to participate in the final vote until 3 February 2023, with the questionnaire being presented on the official website of FIFA. The selected goals were also voted on by a panel of "FIFA experts". Both groups' votes weighed equally on the ultimate winner of the award.

Marcin Oleksy won the award with 21 scoring points, becoming the first amputee footballer to earn the honour.

FIFA Fan Award

The award celebrates the best fan moments or gestures of August 2021 to December 2022, regardless of championship, gender or nationality. The shortlist was compiled by a panel of FIFA experts.

Argentina fans won the award with over 650,000 registered votes.

FIFA Fair Play Award

The Best FIFA Special Award 
An additional award was given out posthumously in tribute to the late Pelé, to recognize his role and contribution to the sport of football. The award was received by Pelé's wife Marcia Aoki.

FIFA FIFPRO Men's World 11

The 26–player men's shortlist was announced on 13 February 2023.

The players chosen were Thibaut Courtois as goalkeeper, Achraf Hakimi, Virgil van Dijk and João Cancelo as defenders, Kevin De Bruyne, Casemiro and Luka Modrić as midfielders, and Lionel Messi, Karim Benzema, Erling Haaland and Kylian Mbappé as forwards.

 Other nominees

FIFA FIFPRO Women's World 11

The 23–player women's shortlist was announced on 13 February 2023.

The players chosen were Christiane Endler as goalkeeper, Lucy Bronze, Mapi León, Wendie Renard and Leah Williamson as defenders, Lena Oberdorf, Alexia Putellas and Keira Walsh as midfielders, and Sam Kerr, Beth Mead and Alex Morgan as forwards.

 Other nominees

References

External links
 Official website

2022
2022 in association football
2022 sports awards
Women's association football trophies and awards
2022 in women's association football